Nanohammus sinicus is a species of beetle in the family Cerambycidae. It was described by Maurice Pic in 1925. It is known from China.

References

Lamiini
Beetles described in 1925